Sean Michael Kyer (born July 31, 2001) is a Canadian actor who played the role of Oscar in 51 episodes of the children's live action educational television series Odd Squad from 2014 until 2017. Kyer has also appeared in the series Continuum as Sam Cameron and When Calls the Heart as Albert Bickley.

Career 
Sean Michael Kyer was born on July 31, 2001 in Vancouver, British Columbia, where he began a minor acting career as an infant. His first television role was at the age of 9, when he played "Brian" in an season 1 episode of the sci-fi television series V in 2010. Kyer obtained more slight roles in television namely discrete roles in episodes of Fringe, Alcatraz, Falling Skies, Cedar Cove and Supernatural. His first film role was in the film Girl in Progress.  He also had a voice role in the TV movie A Fairly Odd Christmas. He appeared on two episodes of R.L. Stine's: The Haunting Hour as two different characters. Afterwards, Kyer had a main character part on 10 episodes of Continuum and as Oscar in Odd Squad from 2014 to 2017. In addition to those roles Kyer had a recurring role in 7 episodes of When Calls The Heart between 2014 and 2015.

In 2016, Kyer won a Leo award for his role as Oscar in Odd Squad.

Filmography

External links

References 

2001 births
Living people
Canadian male television actors
Canadian male child actors
Male actors from Vancouver
21st-century Canadian male actors